Anthony France (born 11 April 1939 in Sheffield) was an English professional footballer who played as a striker for Huddersfield Town, Darlington and Stockport County.

References
Alan Hodgson - Huddersfield Town F.C. Matchday Programme - 2007-08 season

English footballers
Association football forwards
English Football League players
Huddersfield Town A.F.C. players
Darlington F.C. players
Stockport County F.C. players
1939 births
Living people
Place of birth missing (living people)